Køge (older spelling Kjøge) is a seaport on the coast of Køge Bugt (Bay of Køge) 39 km southwest of Copenhagen. It is the principal town and seat of Køge Municipality, Region Sjælland, Denmark. In 2022, the urban area had a population of 38,304.

The natural harbour and strategic location have given Køge a long history as a market town. Today, that past is evident in a well-preserved old town centre with many half-timbered houses.

Køge is located in the Copenhagen metropolitan area and is connected to downtown Copenhagen by the E line of the S-train commuter rail system. Køge is also on the Copenhagen-Ringsted Line that was opened in June 2019. The new line positioned Køge as a central hub in Denmark's transport system.

History 
Like most Danish cities, the origins of Køge precede written history. Køge was first recognized as an official market town in 1288, as a contrast to the ecclesiastical center at that time – Roskilde – and was an important merchant town during the late Middle Ages.

During the local witchhunt, called Køge Huskors (1608–1615), at least 15 people were convicted of witchcraft and burned at the stake.
Køge suffered during the wars between Denmark and Sweden (1643–1720, → Battle of Køge Bay). In 1807, the town and surrounding area was the scene of the Battle of Køge between British and Danish troops. Køge remained a small town until the late 19th century, when industrial development and population growth began. Today, Køge forms the core of the 18th most populous urban area in Denmark.

Geography
Køge is located at the back of Bay of Køge, demarcated by Copenhagen to the north and the Stevns Peninsula to the south, where Køge Å (Køge Creek) meets the sea.

Apart from Køge proper, the town's urban area consists of the suburbs of Køge Nord (Ølby Lyng and Ølsemagle Lyng) to the north and Hastrup and Herfølge to the south.

Economy
The port is directly connected with the Scandinavian Transport Centre, a large business park on the northwestern outskirts of Køge, where – among others – the headquarters and the Danish distribution centre of the multinational, Danish-founded, discount supermarket chain Netto is located.

Culture

Museums
Køge Museum is located at 4 Nørregade in a preserved former merchant's house from the year 1619. Further down the street, in No. 29, lies KØS Museum of art in public spaces. It is the only art museum in Denmark dedicated specifically to sketches and models for art works in the public realm. Among its holdings is the original model for The Little Mermaid in Copenhagen.

Architecture
The historical architecture of the town centre is one of the major attractions of Køge. The oldest dated half-timbered house in Denmark, which is also the oldest dated non-nobility and non-religious building of the nordic countries, can be found in Køge. It was built in 1527. Originally a section of a row of hovels, it is now a part of the public library. Pictures can be found in the gallery. The Third largest Viking Ring Fortress was found near the city of Køge, Denmark.

Near the house is Sankt Nicolai Church. The tower of the church contains a lighthouse, which was the first to be built in Denmark.
 
Køge Town Hall dates from 1552 and is the oldest town hall in Denmark still in use as such.

Køge Torv, the market square, is, with an area of almost 1 hectare (2.5 acres), the largest town square in Denmark outside Copenhagen and the largest and best-preserved medieval town square in Denmark. There are fair days on the square Wednesday and Saturday.

Kjøge Miniby  (Kjøge Mini-Town) is a historically correct model of the town from the year 1865 – built to a scale of 1:10.

Sports
The football club HB Køge was created through a merger of professional football between Herfølge Boldklub and Køge Boldklub in 2009. It currently plays in the Danish 1st Division. Their home ground is Køge Sports Park (Capelli Sport Stadium).

Gallery

Transport

Roads
The partial Y interchange, where the Danish part of the motorway E20 meet the Danish part of the motorway E47 and E55, is located only few kilometers northwest of Køge.

Railway stations
Køge station is the principal railway station of the town. Copenhagen S-train has a line which begins here. Regional trains to Roskilde and Næstved and local trains to Stevns. There are also an S-train station in the northern part of Ølby Lyng and a local train station in the southern suburb of Herfølge.

The Køge Nord Station opened on 1 June 2019 and serves as an Intercity, regional and S-train station.

Port of Køge
The Port of Køge  is one of the oldest ports in Denmark but has been modernised over the last few years. Since 2002, there has been a ferry connection to Rønne on the Baltic island of Bornholm, operated by BornholmerFærgen.

Notable people 

 Jesper Brochmand (1585 in Køge - 1652) a Danish Lutheran clergyman, theologian and Bishop of the Diocese of Zealand
 Hans Holst (before 1619 - after 1640) a Danish woodcarver did work in St Nicholas Church
 Marie Toft (1813 in the Gammel Køgegård manor – 1854) a wealthy Danish landowner who managed Rønnebæksholm and wife of philosopher N. F. S. Grundtvig
 Carl Christian Amussen (1825–1902) was Utah's first jeweler, emigrated to New Zealand 1857, then to Utah, 1868
 Emmy Drachmann (1854–1928) a Danish writer and the wife of Holger Drachmann
 Harald Bergstedt (1877-1965) a Danish writer, novelist, playwright and poet 
 Finn Kjærsdam (born 1943) a Danish Land Surveyor, brought up in Køge
 Michael Falch (born 1956) a Danish singer, guitarist, author and actor 
 Doggie (artist) (born 1966) a Danish hip-hop artist in Copenhagen and Istanbul
 Ulla Miilmann (born 1972) is the principal flautist of the DNSO, brought up in Vemmedrup
 Michael Qureshi (born 1976) a Danish journalist, used fake sources

Sport 

 Ove Frederiksen (1884–1966) a tennis player, competed at the 1912 Summer Olympics
 Hans Pedersen (1887 in Højelse near Køge – 1943) a Danish gymnast who competed in the 1912 and 1920 Summer Olympics
 Henry Larsen (1916–2002) rower, team bronze medallist 1948 Summer Olympics
 Børge Raahauge Nielsen (1920–2010) rower, team bronze medallist 1948 Summer Olympics
 Casper Ankergren (born 1979) a former football goalkeeper, 319 club caps
 Klaus Nielsen (born 1980) a pro. mountain biker, competed at the 2008 Summer Olympics
 Søren Larsen (born 1981) retired footballer, 229 club caps and 20 for Denmark
 Nicklas Pedersen (born 1987) a Danish former footballer with 250 club caps and 13 for Denmark, now U17 manager at HB Køge
 Lena Grebak (born 1991) a Danish female badminton player
 Emil Holst (born 1991) a Danish badminton player
 Sebastian Lander (born 1991) a road bicycle racer, won the Danish national road race championship in 2012

See also
 Køge Stadion
 Gammel Køgegård
 Nearby towns: Greve Strand, Roskilde, Ringsted and Haslev.
 Chronicle of the Expulsion of the Grayfriars#Chapter 10 Concerning the Friary in Køge

References

External links

 Historic maps of Køge

 
Municipal seats of Region Zealand
Municipal seats of Denmark
Cities and towns in Region Zealand
Port cities and towns of the Baltic Sea
Køge Municipality